Replacement worker is a person employed to replace workers who are on strike, recently sacked, away on long term leave (such as for military duty) or otherwise lost. It may refer to:

 H-1B visa
 L-1 visa
 Lockout (industry)
 Outsourcing
 Strike action
 Strikebreaker

Euphemisms